Bovenkarspel is a town in the municipality of Stede Broec in the Dutch province of North Holland. Until 1979, it was a separate municipality.

Legionella outbreak

In March 1999 an outbreak of Legionnaires' disease occurred during a flower exhibition in Bovenkarspel. Many people were hospitalized in Hoorn. 318 people became ill and at least 32 died. Probably more victims died and were buried before the legionellosis infection was recognized. The source of the bacteria was probably a whirlpool and a humidifier in the exhibition area.

Railway stations

There are 2 railway stations in Bovenkarspel - Bovenkarspel-Grootebroek and Bovenkarspel Flora - with half-hourly connections to Hoorn, Amsterdam and Enkhuizen.

Former municipalities of North Holland
Populated places in North Holland
Stede Broec